Ecochard or Écochard is a French surname. Notable people with the surname include: 

Henri Ecochard (1923–2020), French military officer
Michel Écochard (1905–1985), French architect and urban planner

French-language surnames